Rani Profulla Kumari Devi of Bastar (1910 – 28 Feb 1936) was the Rani regnant (queen regnant) of the Indian Princely Bastar State between 1922 and 1936. 

She succeeded Rudra Pratap Deo on 23 November 1922. She ruled for fourteen years. 

She married Prince Prafulla Chandra Bhanj Deo of Mayurbhanj.

She was succeeded by Pravir Chandra Bhanj Deo.

References

 https://guide2womenleaders.com/womeninpower/Womeninpower1900.htm

Indian female royalty
20th-century women rulers
1910 births
1936 deaths